Tyler Wideman (born November 18, 1995) is an American professional basketball player for A.S. Ramat HaSharon of the Israeli National League. He played college basketball at Butler Bulldogs from 2014 to 2018 before playing professionally in Croatia and Israel.

College career
As a senior at Butler Bulldogs in 2017-18 Wideman averaged 6.6 points and 4.6 rebounds in 20.5 minutes in 34 appearances. On December 27, 2017, he contributed 15 points and 8 rebounds in 91–89 win against Georgetown. On February 1, 2018, he had 23 points and 9 rebounds in a 92–72 win over Marquette.

Professional career
On July 20, 2018, he signed his first professional contract with Croatian basketball club Cedevita Zagreb. In 18 games played for Cedevita, he averaged 7.6 points and 4.6 rebounds per game, while shooting 58 percent from the field.

On July 28, 2019, Wideman signed with Maccabi Ra'anana of the Israeli National League for the 2019–20 season. He  averaged 16 points and 7 rebounds per game. On August 20, 2020, Wideman signed with Soproni KC of the Hungarian league. In 2021, he signed with A.S. Ramat HaSharon of the Israeli National League.

National team career
In the summer of 2019, Wideman was a part of the United States National team who competed at the Pan American Games in Peru. The team won bronze.

References

External links
Eurobasket.com Profile
NBA.com Profile
RealGM profile
Butler Bulldogs bio

1995 births
Living people
American expatriate basketball people in Croatia
American expatriate basketball people in Hungary
American expatriate basketball people in Israel
American men's basketball players
Basketball players at the 2019 Pan American Games
Basketball players from Indiana
Butler Bulldogs men's basketball players
Centers (basketball)
KK Cedevita players
Maccabi Ra'anana players
Pan American Games bronze medalists for the United States
Pan American Games medalists in basketball
People from Schererville, Indiana
Power forwards (basketball)
Sportspeople from the Chicago metropolitan area
Medalists at the 2019 Pan American Games
United States men's national basketball team players